Andrew John Miketa (November 1, 1929 - April 10, 2010) was an American professional football Center who played in the NFL for the Detroit Lions from 1954 to 1955.

References

1929 births
2010 deaths
Detroit Lions players
American football centers
People from Girard, Ohio
Players of American football from Ohio